Younger family may refer to:
Younger (surname)
Characters in A Raisin in the Sun
James–Younger Gang